(lit., "parquet work") is a type of traditional Japanese marquetry developed in Edo period Japan in the town of . Resembling a type of mosaic,  is created through the combination of fine oblong rods of wood chosen for their grain, texture and colour, and is well-known for its intricately patterned nature. 

Both the spindle tree (Euonymus spp.) and Ilex macropoda are used for the colour white; aged wood from the  tree (Cercidiphyllum japonicum) for is used for black; Picrasma quassioides, mulberry (Morus alba) and the Chinese lacquer tree (Toxicodendron vernicifluum) are used for yellow; the camphor tree (Cinnamomum camphora) and Maackia are used for brown, black walnut (Juglans nigra) for purple, the Japanese cucumber tree (Magnolia obovata) for blue and Chinese cedar (Toona sinensis) for red. 

The rods are glued together to form large sections of the desired geometric pattern, which is often called a seed plate, before either being sliced into thin layers (in the  technique), which are then glued onto boxes and other handicraft works. Alternatively, the entire plate can be carved out (in the  technique) to create a single piece. To add to the glaze and sturdiness of the surface, finishing coatings of lacquer are applied.

 is commonly found on the outside of traditional Japanese secret boxes or puzzle boxes, but may also be used to create or decorate many other items, such as trays, chests, jewelry boxes, vases, photo frames and drink coasters.

See also
Marquetry

External links
Collection Ruth und Clemens Stupperich  Yosegi - collection (catalogue)

Surface decorative techniques in woodworking
Japanese art
Edo period
Japanese words and phrases